The Alpena News is a general daily newspaper in the city of Alpena, Michigan in the United States. It has an approximate circulation of 10,000, and is published by Ogden Newspapers Inc. News reports are available on line. The paper was founded in 1899.
 The paper currently has between 20 and 50 employees.

It is the newspaper of record for Alpena County. The circulation area of the Alpena News covers much of Northern Michigan, with a particular emphasis on counties in the northeast lower peninsula.

History
On August 1, 1899, E.S. Meers began publishing The Alpena Evening News.  It was renamed as The Alpena News in 1914.

In its early years it was edited by James Collins, a fiery and opinionated Irishman, who continued as editor until 1909 when he then edited the Alpena Argus-Pioneer.

Alpena had many papers initially.  There have been at least a dozen papers (some are name changes) over the years.  In 1900, there were two dailies, the Echo and the News; and three weeklies, Alpena Weekly Argus, Farmer and Pioneer.  The News was left as the sole survivor by 1918.

The Alpena News is owned by Ogden Newspapers, which includes Escanaba's Daily Press, Houghton's The Daily Mining Gazette, Iron Mountain Daily News, Marquette's The Mining Journal, and Discover.

Notes

References

Sources

External links
The Alpena News home page.

Newspapers published in Michigan
Alpena County, Michigan
Newspapers established in 1899
Alpena
1899 establishments in Michigan